Ardon Jashari (born 30 July 2002) is a Swiss footballer who plays as a midfielder for FC Luzern and the Switzerland national team.

Club career
Jashari made his professional debut with Luzern in a 2–1 Swiss Super League win over FC Zürich on 31 July 2020.

International career
Jashari made his debut for the Switzerland national football team on 27 September 2022 in a Nations League game against the Czech Republic, substituting Remo Freuler in added time.

Personal life
Jashari was born in Switzerland, and is of ethnic Albanian descent from North Macedonia.

References

External links
 
 
 SFL Profile

2002 births
People from Cham, Switzerland
Sportspeople from the canton of Zug
Swiss people of Macedonian descent
Swiss people of Albanian descent
Living people
Swiss men's footballers
Switzerland under-21 international footballers
Switzerland international footballers
Association football midfielders
FC Luzern players
Swiss 1. Liga (football) players
Swiss Super League players
2022 FIFA World Cup players